Warnołęka  (formerly ) is a village in the administrative district of Gmina Nowe Warpno, within Police County, West Pomeranian Voivodeship, in northwestern Poland, close to the German border.

The village has a population of 170.

References

Villages in Police County